Martin Fleig (born 15 October 1989) is a German male Paralympic cross-country skier and biathlete.

Career
He made his Paralympic debut during the 2014 Winter Paralympics which was held in Sochi, Russia. Martin went onto compete at the 2018 Winter Paralympics, his second consecutive Winter Paralympic event and claimed his first Paralympic medal in the biathlon event.

Martin Fleig clinched a gold medal in the men's 15km sitting event during the 2018 Winter Paralympics.

References

External links 
 
 

1989 births
Living people
German male biathletes
German male cross-country skiers
Paralympic biathletes of Germany
Paralympic cross-country skiers of Germany
Paralympic gold medalists for Germany
Paralympic silver medalists for Germany
Paralympic medalists in biathlon
Biathletes at the 2014 Winter Paralympics
Biathletes at the 2018 Winter Paralympics
Biathletes at the 2022 Winter Paralympics
Cross-country skiers at the 2014 Winter Paralympics
Cross-country skiers at the 2018 Winter Paralympics
Medalists at the 2018 Winter Paralympics
Medalists at the 2022 Winter Paralympics
Sportspeople from Freiburg im Breisgau
21st-century German people